Monastery of Our Lady of Charity is a historic church monastery at 1900 Montana in San Antonio, Texas.

It was built in 1899 and added to the National Register of Historic Places in 1999.

References

Properties of religious function on the National Register of Historic Places in Texas
National Register of Historic Places in San Antonio
Roman Catholic churches in Texas
Roman Catholic monasteries in the United States
Gothic Revival architecture in Texas
Roman Catholic churches completed in 1899
19th-century Christian monasteries
Roman Catholic churches in San Antonio
19th-century Roman Catholic church buildings in the United States